Saif Ali Naqvi is a social activist and General secretary  of the Indian National Congress (I). 
He is also a Member of Indian Youth Congress since 2006.

Biography

Early life

Saif is a member of the Naqvi family, one of the prominent families in Lakhimpur.

Education and early career
Saif Ali Naqvi attended  the Institute of Management Technology, Ghaziabad and holds a PGDBM in Marketing. He completed his Bachelor of Arts (Hons.) in social work from Jamia Millia Islamia, New Delhi, and did his schooling at Delhi Public School, R. K. Puram.

Saif Ali Naqvi is an educationist and runs various education institutions and skill development centres. Saif has worked with United Nations. Saif has worked as a branch manager with Citi Financial and later as sales manager with Met Life.

Political career
Saif Ali Naqvi's  16 year political journey is most fulfilling. Saif is the general secretary of Indian National Congress at Uttar Pradesh. Saif has been the spokesperson  एंड secretary of Uttar Pradesh congress committee.
Saif has contested  election for Member of Legislative Assembly, Palia kalan for 2017 elections in Uttar Pradesh but lost to Romi Sahani

Personal life
Saif Ali Naqvi is son of Zafar Ali Naqvi, an Indian politician and member of the Parliament of India, representing the Lakhimpur Kheri constituency. Saif is married to Sana Naqvi who comes from the Nawab family of Ghaziabad. They are parents of 2 sons, Ibrahim Ali Naqvi and Zafir Ali Naqvi.

See also
 Indian National Congress
 Lakhimpur Kheri
 Zafar Ali Naqvi

References
 Election Campaign
 Lakhimpur Elections

Indian National Congress politicians
Indian Muslims
Delhi Public School alumni
Institute of Management Technology, Ghaziabad alumni
Jamia Millia Islamia alumni
People from Lakhimpur Kheri
Living people
Year of birth missing (living people)